Roland Henry Flint (February 27, 1934 - January 2, 2001) was an American poet and professor of English at Georgetown University.

Life
Born in Park River, North Dakota, he attended the University of North Dakota before joining the United States Marine Corps.  He served in post-war Korea and then returned to and graduated from the University of North Dakota. He earned an M.A. in English from Marquette University and a Ph.D. from the University of Minnesota, where he wrote his dissertation on the early work of Theodore Roethke, and began to publish his poetry.

He was a professor of English at Georgetown University from 1968-1997, and received several university awards for his teaching. During his tenure at Georgetown, Flint received MacDowell (formerly MacDowell Colony) residency awards in 1976, 1983, and 1985. While at MacDowell, he befriended fellow awardee American composer and printer Paul W. Whear, who hand typeset and letterpress printed "The Honey and Other Poems for Rosalind" for its publication.

Flint had a phenomenal memory for poetry, and could recite thousands of poems he knew "by heart".  He was Poet Laureate of Maryland from 1995-2000, when he resigned due to poor health.
He died of pancreatic cancer in 2001 at the age of 66.
His papers are held at the University of Maryland.

Selected bibliography

Poetry
Easy (Louisiana State University, 1999)
Pigeon (North Carolina Wesleyan, 1991)
Hearing Voices, with William Stafford, (Willamette University, 1991)
Stubborn (University of illinois1990)
Sicily (North Carolina Wesleyan, 1987)
Resuming Green (The Dial Press, 1982)
Say It (Dryad Press, 1979)
The Honey and Other Poems for Rosalind (Unicorn Publications, Limited, 1976)
And Morning (Dryad Press, 1975)

References

External links
http://www.washingtonpost.com/ac2/wp-dyn?pagename=article&node=&contentId=A43118-2001Mar8 accessed December 22, 2006
http://www.calvin.edu/january/1999/keilflin.htm accessed December 22, 2006
https://web.archive.org/web/20060214175155/http://aomol.net/msa/mdmanual/01glance/html/poet.html accessed December 22, 2006

American male poets
People from Walsh County, North Dakota
University of North Dakota alumni
Poets from North Dakota
Poets Laureate of Maryland
1934 births
2001 deaths
University of Minnesota alumni
Georgetown University faculty
Deaths from pancreatic cancer
20th-century American poets
20th-century American male writers